Square Dance is a ballet made by New York City Ballet co-founder and balletmaster 
George Balanchine to Antonio Vivaldi's Concerto Grosso in B minor and the first movement of his Concerto Grosso in E major, Op. 3, nos. 10 and 12, respectively; in 1976 he added Arcangelo Corelli's Sarabanda, Badinerie e Giga, second and third movements. The premiere took place on November 21, 1957, at City Center of Music and Drama, New York, with lighting by Mark Stanley. The original version placed the musicians on stage with a square dance caller calling the steps; from its 1976 revival the caller was eliminated, the orchestra placed in the pit, and a solo added for the premier danseur to the Corelli Sarabanda. The Pacific Northwest Ballet restored the caller for one performance at the 2007 Vail International Dance Festival.

Original cast
Patricia Wilde
Nicholas Magallanes

References

Playbill, New York City Ballet, Friday, June 27, 2008
''Dance review: OBT does a little 'Song and Dance', Arts Dispatch, Monday, April 25, 2011

Reviews 

 
NY Times by John Martin, November 22, 1957
NY Times by Anna Kisselgoff, May 22, 1976
NY Times by Jack Anderson, October 13, 1984
Ballet Dance review by Jeff Kuo, April 3, 2004

Seattle Times by Moira Macdonald, September 22, 2007
NY Times by Alastair Macaulay, September 25, 2007
NY Times by Alastair Macaulay, April 1, 2008
NY Times by Alastair Macaulay, June 30, 2008

External links 

 Square Dance on the website of the Balanchine Trust

Ballets by George Balanchine
New York City Ballet repertory
1957 ballet premieres
Ballets to the music of Antonio Vivaldi
Ballets to the music of Arcangelo Corelli